The Coriell Institute for Medical Research is an independent, non-profit biomedical research center dedicated to the study of the human genome. Coriell features programs in biobanking, personalized medicine, cell biology, cytogenetics, genotyping, and induced pluripotent stem cell science.  Located in downtown Camden, New Jersey, the Institute has partnered with several prominent state and national health leaders, including Cooper University Hospital, the Cooper Medical School of Rowan University, the United States Air Force, the University of Pennsylvania, and Stanford University.

History

Coriell Institute was chartered in 1953 as the South Jersey Medical Research Foundation Laboratory and constructed facilities in 1956. The laboratory was later named for director Lewis L. Coriell, who had worked at the Camden Municipal Hospital and developed aseptic tissue culture techniques that ultimately allowed poliovirus to be grown in culture. Dr. Coriell also led the field trials for the resulting vaccine.

Operations

Biobanking

Regarded as one of the most diverse sources of cell lines and DNA available to the international research community, the Coriell Biorepositories maintain longstanding contracts with the National Institutes of Health and houses several significant collections, including the National Institute of General Medical Sciences Human Genetic Cell Repository, the National Institute of Neurological Disorders and Stroke Human Genetics DNA and Cell Line Repository, and the National Institute on Aging Cell Repository. The Institute houses cells for biotechnology companies and research foundations as well.

Research

In 2018, Coriell partnered with Cooper University Health Care and the Cooper Medical School of Rowan University to form the Camden Opioid Research Initiative (CORI), a state-funded research project studying risk factors for opioid use disorder. CORI utilizes a three-pronged approach: a study of chronic pain patients, a study of patients currently being treated for opioid use disorder, and the creation of a novel biobank of biological specimens as a resource for addiction researchers.

Coriell also contributes to the precision medicine space with its innovative research study, the Coriell Personalized Medicine Collaborative (CPMC). Launched in 2007, the CPMC was a longitudinal initiative involving a network of physicians, scientists, genetic counselors, and hospital and academic partners. The study aims to explore the clinical utility of genetic information and returned individualized reports to nearly 8,000 volunteer participants detailing genetic and non-genetic risks for complex disease.

A spin-off company called Coriell Life Sciences was formed in January 2013 from a partnership between the Coriell Institute for Medical Research and IBM. The company offers full-service pharmacogenetics screening options to a range of different organizations.

Services

Coriell offers a diverse selection of services to customers and partners interested in outsourcing scientific work. Some of Coriell’s offered services include the creation of induced pluripotent stem cell lines, cell line authentication, cytogenetic analysis, DNA and RNA isolation, and public and private biobanking services.

Coriell’s quality management system has been certified to the latest ISO 9001:2015 standards.

Management 

 Jean-Pierre Issa - President and Chief Executive Officer
 Dean Stoios - Senior Vice President and Chief Financial Officer
 Nahid Turan - Chief Biobanking Officer
 Leo Jose- Chief Information Officer
 Jaroslav Jelinek - Chief Scientific Officer

 Donna Altamuro- Associate Director, Biobanking Logistics & Customer Service
 Ryan Cunningham- Associate Director, Financial Planning and Analysis
 Courtney Mengel Dirks - Director, Public Relations
 Kathryn Driesbaugh - Director, Repository Operations
 Stacey Heil - Associate Director, Business Development
 Kelly Hodges - Associate Director, Laboratory Production
 Phill Hodges - Associate Director of IT Infrastructure
 Jian Huang - Senior Scientist for Stem Cell Biology and Gene Engineering
 Xing Jian - Research Scientist
 Jozef Madzo - Director of Bioinformatics
 Matthew W. Mitchell - Program Manager
 Diego Morales - Associate Director of Laboratory Services
 Ruby O'Lexy - Director, Research Office
 Laura Scheinfeldt - Director of Repository Science

References

External links 
 

Biobank organizations
Biobanks
Medical research institutes in New Jersey
Buildings and structures in Camden, New Jersey
Education in Camden County, New Jersey
Research institutes established in 1953
1953 establishments in New Jersey
Biotechnology organizations
Rowan University